La Nave Del Olvido (The ship of oblivion) is the title of the studio album released by Mexican singer José José in 1970.

The most popular songs were "La nave del olvido", "Nadie, simplemente nadie" and "Del altar a la tumba", in what proved to be one of the richest productions of José José, combining the talent of composers such as Armando Manzanero, Rubén Fuentes, Dino Ramos and Nacho González, among others. Furthermore, the large orchestras of Chucho Ferrer and Magallanes, gives a unique touch to the production. With this album he earned a gold and platinum disc for its high sales.

Track listing
"La nave del olvido" (Dino Ramos)
"El día más triste del mundo" (Armando Manzanero)
"Si alguien me dijera" (Armando Manzanero)
"Ven y verás" (Ignacio "Nacho" González)
"Alguien" (Rubén Fuentes; Martha Roth)
"Ella es así" (Rubén Fuente)
"Del altar a la tumba" (Armando Manzanero; Luis De Llano)
"Y el mundo sigue girando" (Leo Dan; Leonardo Favio; Roberto Lambertucci)
"Nadie, simplemente nadie" (Susana Fernández)
"Mirar el amor" (Alfonso Ontivero)
"Avalancha" (Ignacio "Nacho" González)
"Un mundo para ti" (Armando Manzanero)

1970 albums
José José albums
Spanish-language albums
RCA Records albums